Time Tunnel is an adventure game released for the Commodore 64 in 1985. The aim of the game is to teleport between different ages to solve puzzles, find "The Seven Scriptures" and become King of the Gnomes.

Gameplay
The locations in the game are:
 The Gnome Mansion, where the time machine is assembled
 Stone Age, 9600 BC
 Magical Persia, 893 BC
 Mythological Greece, 86 BC
 Colonial Salem, Massachusetts, 1692 AD
 California Gold Rush, 1849 AD
 Intergalactic Spaceship, 3456 AD
 The Black Hole, 9999 AD

References

1985 video games
Commodore 64 games
Commodore 64-only games
Video games about time travel
Adventure games
Video games developed in the United Kingdom